Kut-e Seyyed Saleh (also Romanized as Kūt-e Seyyed Şāleḩ, Kooté Sayyed Saleh, and Kūt Saiyid Salih) is a village in Kut-e Abdollah Rural District, in the Central District of Karun County, Khuzestan Province, Iran. At the 2006 census, its population was 3,945, in 773 families.

References 

Populated places in Karun County